Gohlis is an area in the north of the city of Leipzig, Germany. Once a village outside the city, it is known as the place where Friedrich Schiller wrote the first version of his Ode to Joy in 1785. 
It urbanised during the Gründerzeit period of the 19th century and was incorporated into the city of Leipzig in 1890. Dominated by residential buildings from the late-19th and first half of the 20th century, Gohlis has a population of more than 45,000 inhabitants (2020).

Geography 
The original settlement was located on the north-eastern edge of the floodplain of White Elster and Luppe, north of the confluence of Nördliche Rietzschke and Parthe, and south of the old Schkeuditzer Landstraße (road from Leipzig to Schkeuditz; today's Georg-Schumann-Straße). The original linear village stretched about 600 metres along the bent village road. It borders on the city core of Leipzig to the south-east, Eutritzsch to the east, Möckern to the west and Wiederitzsch to the north.

History

Village 
The village was probably founded by Slavic Sorbs in the seventh century. Early forms of the name were  Golitz, Goliz or Golis. The old Sorbian root gol meant bare, barren and is possibly a description of the unforested immediate hinterland of the village. The ending -its/-itz is typical for Slavic villages.

In the course of the German expansion to the east, Flemish settlers established themselves in the region. The first documented mention is in the year 1317, in which the village grant of land to the Cistercian monastery of St. George is mentioned.

The rulers of Gohlis were the Margraves of Meissen or Landsberg, and later the Electors of Saxony from the Ernestine branch of the House of Wettin (1423–1485), then the Albertine Dukes, Electors and Kings of Saxony. Within the Saxon state, the village Gohlis belonged to the district of Leipzig.

The village Gohlis belonged to the seigneury (lordship) of the manor Gohlis, by which it was subject to patrimonial law. In 1659, Michael Heinrich Horn (1623–1681), a professor of medicine and chemistry at the Leipzig University, acquired the manor and the seigneury of Gohlis. Law professor Lüder Mencke (1658–1726) acquired the manor in 1720 and modernised the local law. Christiana Regina Hetzer (1724–1780) and her second husband, the Leipzig merchant and alderman Johann Caspar Richter (1708–1770), built a summer residence in rococo style in 1755/1756. The so-called Gohliser Schlösschen ("little palace of Gohlis") is nowadays used as restaurant and for cultural events. After Richter's death, Christiana Regina remarried, making her third husband, the historian Johann Gottlob Böhme (1717–1780) lord of the manor. 

The next owner was Christiana Regina's brother, Johann Hieronymus Hetzer (1723–1788). He was a patron of the arts, making Gohlis known as a "Court of the Muses". At the invitation of Hetzer and his friend Christian Gottfried Körner, poet and playwright Friedrich Schiller spent the summer of 1785 in Gohlis. He worked on the second act of his play Don Carlos, edited the Fiesco and wrote the first version of the Ode to Joy. The farmhouse in which Schiller lived is the oldest house standing in Gohlis. It was built in 1700 and has hardly changed since the 18th Century. In 1841, the Leipzig Schiller Society erected a memorial site which is now the "Schillerhaus" museum.

In 1793, the city of Leipzig became the owner of the manor and acquired the underlying seigneury. Even after the city sold the manor to the House of Alvensleben in 1832, it continued to exercise the local jurisdiction. Under Saxony's 1838 Municipal Code, Gohlis was made a separate rural municipality with the right of local self-governance, ending the late-feudal system of manorialism. At that time, Gohlis comprised 54 houses and 578 inhabitants. During the Industrial Revolution, Gohlis was connected to the Magdeburg–Leipzig railway in 1840.

During the following decades, the village experienced a rapid population growth. In 1871, it counted 5015 inhabitants, effectively becoming a suburb of the booming city of Leipzig. A new school was built in 1860–61. In 1870 Gohlis became a separate Lutheran parish, the neo-Gothic Peace Church was consecrated in 1873. In the same year, Gohlis was connected to the Leipzig tram network (then horse-drawn, electrified after 1896). Adolf Bleichert moved his cableway factory to Gohlis in 1881, becoming one of the largest and most well-known industrial plants of this place. The Royal Saxon Army developed an extensive barracks area between northern Gohlis and the neighbouring village Möckern.

Part of Leipzig 

Gohlis, like several other suburbanised villages around Leipzig, was incorporated into the city in 1890. At that time, Gohlis already counted 19,312 inhabitants. After the 1898 local plan, the built-up area was extended massively to the north, beyond the railway line that had been the settlement's northern border so far. Residential neighbourhoods were developed in the following years, mostly blocks of four-storey multi-family residentials, but also areas with upscale detached houses in ornamental historicist styles or Jugendstil (Art nouveau).

The next step of residential development was the Bauhaus-style Krochsiedlung (named after German-Jewish banker Hans Kroch) built in the far-north of Gohlis in 1929/30. Planned as a satellite city for 15,000 people, only a quarter of the project was completed before being halted by the ramifications of the Great Depression and finally abandoned after the Nazi seizure of power. The modernist Church of Reconciliation, intended as the centre of that satellite city, was consecrated in 1932. One year later, Gohlis counted 54,581 inhabitants. Instead of Bauhaus-style apartment blocks, housing development was resumed in the 1930s with more conventional single-family and duplex houses. During the Allied airstrikes of 1943-45, Gohlis suffered some damages, but was less affected than other parts of the city.

Under the communist rule in East Germany, residential development was complemented by 1960s blocks of housing cooperatives and a minor Plattenbau estate built at the northern end of Gohlis in the 1980s. Most of the old building stock deteriorated. After the German reunification in 1990, almost all industrial plants closed down. Since then, Gohlis is dominated by residential use, small-scale services and retail. A few commercial centres were built during the 1990s. At the same time, most of the old buildings were renovated, making Gohlis again one of the most coveted residential areas of Leipzig. In the 2010s, it experienced another building boom by urban consolidation. From 32,500 inhabitants in 2000, the population rose to more than 45,000 in 2020.

References

External links

Geography of Leipzig
Former municipalities in Saxony